Chalon may refer to:

Culture
Chalon people, a Native American tribe of California
Chalon language, an Ohlone language spoken by the Chalon people

Places
Chalon, Isère, formerly Châlons, in France's Isère département 
Le Chalon, in the Drôme département
Château-Chalon, in the Jura département
Charnay-lès-Chalon, in the Saône-et-Loire département
Chalon-sur-Saône, in the Saône-et-Loire département
FC Chalon, a football club
RC Chalon, a rugby union club

Persons
 Chalon (surname)
 House of Chalon, a French and Dutch noble house
 House of Chalon-Arlay
 Chalon head, series of postage stamps designed by Alfred Edward Chalon

See also
Châlons (disambiguation)